The Void may refer to:

Fiction

Film and TV 
 The Void (2001 film), a 2001 American film directed by Gilbert M. Shilton
 The Void (2016 film), a 2016 Canadian film
 "The Void", an episode of the American animated TV series Sonic the Hedgehog
 "The Void" (Star Trek: Voyager), a 2001 episode of the American TV series
 "The Void", a 2014 episode of Lego Ninjago: Masters of Spinjitzu
 "The Void", a 2014 episode of The Amazing World of Gumball
The Void, a 2021 British game show

Literature 
 The Void (Middle-earth), an uninhabited region of nothingness in J. R. R. Tolkien's cosmology

Video games 
 The Void (video game), a 2008 adventure computer game by Ice-Pick Lodge

Music
 The Void (musician), alias of composer Oumi Kapila

Albums
The Void album by Weesp (band)
 The Void (EP), by British band Hologram, released in 2014

Songs
"The Void", song by Cage
"The Void", song by Meat Puppets from Monsters
"The Void", song by The Raincoats from their 1979 self-titled album
"The Void", song from One Fast Move or I'm Gone 
"The Void", song by Whitechapel from Mark of the Blade
"The Void", song by Nick Oliveri from Leave Me Alone
"The Void", song by Mike Gordon from Moss
"The Void", song by Parkway Drive from their album Reverence
"The Void", song by MC Vinnie Paz with Buckwild and Eamon from album Cornerstone of the Corner Store 2016
"The Void", song by Muse from Simulation Theory
"The Void", song by Metric from Synthetica
"The Void", song by Martha from Love Keeps Kicking
"The Void", song by Kid Cudi from Man on the Moon III

Other
 The Void (philosophy), the philosophical concept of nothingness manifested
 The Void (virtual reality), a virtual-reality business
 The Void (artwork), immaterial artwork by Yves Klein

See also
 Void (disambiguation)